Walk Don't Walk may refer to:

 Walk... Don't Walk, a 1968 film starring Chevy Chase

"Walk Don't Walk", song by Judie Tzuke from Ritmo 1983
"Walk Don't Walk", song Ron Kavanna from Coming Days
"Walk Don't Walk", song from Oh Boy (The Paradise Motel album)
"Walk Don't Walk", song by Prince from Diamonds and Pearls